Ifor Huw Irranca-Davies (né Davies; born 22 January 1963) is a Welsh Labour and Co-operative politician, who has been the Member of the Senedd (MS) for Ogmore since 2016.  He was previously the Member of Parliament (MP) for Ogmore from 2002 to 2016.

Having served as Parliamentary Private Secretary in the Northern Ireland Office, the Department for Work and Pensions, and the Department of Culture, Media and Sport, he became an Assistant Whip in May 2006. On 29 June 2007, he was appointed Parliamentary Under-Secretary of State for Wales, before being promoted to the role of Parliamentary Under-Secretary of State in the Department for the Environment, Food and Rural Affairs. Irranca-Davies resigned his seat in parliament in March 2016 to stand to represent the constituency in the Senedd, winning the seat in the elections held in May 2016.

He was appointed as Minister for Children and Social Care in the Welsh Government on 3 November 2017.

Early life
Irranca-Davies was born Ifor Huw Davies in 1963 to Teresa and Gethin Davies. He campaigned as a boy in general elections for his step great-uncle, Ifor Davies, MP for Gower and deputy to Cledwyn Hughes at the Welsh Office during Harold Wilson's government. He attended Gowerton Comprehensive School (where his mother was a secretary), and later earned a BA (Hons) at Crewe and Alsager College, and an MSc from Swansea Metropolitan University.

After leaving higher education, he worked for local authorities in leisure management; and it was while he was working in a sports centre and she was doing aerobics that he met his wife, Joanna Irranca, born to Italian parents who had come to work in South Wales in the 1950s. On marriage, the couple both changed their surnames to Irranca-Davies; he in particular felt his existing surname was too common. The couple have three sons.

Later, he worked in private sector management, as a lecturer at Swansea Metropolitan University.

Member of Parliament

In 2001, Irranca-Davies was Labour candidate for the Brecon & Radnor constituency, but finished third, behind the Liberal Democrat and Conservative candidates. In the by-election of 14 February 2002 he was elected to the parliamentary seat of Ogmore in the South Wales Valleys (a Labour seat since 1918), after the death of MP and Government Whip Sir Ray Powell. (Irranca-Davies was himself appointed Government Whip for Wales in May 2006 after spells as a Parliamentary Aide in several government departments.) He was re-elected to serve Ogmore in the general elections of May 2005 and May 2010. For the first time in 2010, Ogmore became the largest parliamentary majority of any party and constituency in Wales.

Since his election in 2002 Irranca-Davies has worked on a range of local and national issues, including sitting on the Procedures Select Committee to discuss ways of modernising the work of Parliament and has also sat on Standing Committees for the Police Reform Bill, Fireworks Bill and Communications Bill, among others. He has also held positions on the Welsh Grand Committee and the Northern Ireland Grand Committee. He has worked on Parliamentary Labour Party ('PLP') Committees on Welsh Affairs, Foreign and Commonwealth Affairs, Home Affairs and International Development. He was also the backbench MP representative on the board of the Coal Health Claims Monitoring Subgroup for Wales.

Irranca-Davies has spoken in the House of Commons on topics as varied as international trade union rights, compulsory voting, anti-social behaviour, renewable energy and climate change, fair trade, social justice and poverty and inequality. In June 2005 he became Parliamentary Private Secretary (PPS) to Tessa Jowell, having previously served as PPS to Jane Kennedy at the Northern Ireland Office. He served as PPS to Ministers of the Department for Work and Pensions and Department for Culture, Media and Sport. He worked as Parliamentary Under-Secretary of State of Wales, and as an Environment Minister in the Department for Environment, Food and Rural Affairs (DEFRA). Between October 2010 and October 2011, he served as the Shadow Energy Minister where he led the Labour campaign on the protection of the Feed-In Tariff for solar power. In October 2011, he was appointed as the Shadow Minister on Food and Farming.

He belongs to a number of All Party Groups within Parliament, including the All Party Groups for British Council (Vice-Chair), China Group, Citizens Advice, Clean Coal, Coalfield Communities, Energy Intensive Industries (Vice-Chair), Manufacturing, Maritime and Ports, Steel and Metal Related Industry, Children in Wales, Patient and Public Involvement in Health and Social Care (Co-Chair), University Group (Vice-Chair), and Waterways (Co-Chair). He serves as Chair of the All Party Group for the Recognition of Munitions Workers which aims "work with the government to find a means of recognising those munitions workers who served during the first and second world wars"

On 19 June 2015, Irranca-Davies was elected to the chairmanship of the Environmental Audit Select Committee.

He was one of 36 Labour MPs to nominate Jeremy Corbyn as a candidate in the Labour leadership election of 2015. His last day as MP was on 24 March 2016.

National Assembly for Wales
In October 2015, Irranca-Davies announced his wish to transition from Westminster to Cardiff Bay. In December 2015, he was selected to contest the Ogmore seat for Welsh Labour Party at the forthcoming National Assembly elections scheduled for 5 May 2016.

Irranca-Davies won the Assembly seat, while the vacated Westminster seat was won by Labour's Chris Elmore.

Westminster Parliamentary and UK Government Offices held
May 2005 – May 2006: Parliamentary Private Secretary to the Secretary of State for Culture, Media & Sport
May 2006 – June 2007: Assistant Government Whip
June 2007 – October 2008: Parliamentary Under Secretary of State for Wales
October 2008 – May 2010: Parliamentary Under Secretary of State at the Department for Environment, Food and Rural Affairs (Defra)
October 2008 – June 2009: Natural Environment and Rural Affairs
June 2009 – May 2010: Marine and Natural Environment
May 2010 – October 2010: Shadow Minister for Marine and Natural Environment (Shadow Defra Minister)
October 2010 – October 2011: Shadow Minister for Energy and Climate Change
October 2011 – May 2015: Shadow Minister for Food and Farming
May 2015 – October 2015: Chair, Environmental Audit Select Committee

National Assembly & Welsh Government Offices held
June 2016 – Nov 2017: Chair, National Assembly for Wales, Constitutional and Legislative Affairs Committee 
Nov 2017 – December 2018: Minister for Children and Social Care, Welsh Government

Awards
In 2005 he was voted the 48th sexiest man in Wales by the Western Mail.

In 2011, Irranca-Davies was shortlisted for the first Sports Parliamentarian of the Year award, an initiative introduced by the Sport and Recreation Alliance for the work he has done to promote archery. He was nominated by the Archery GB after he hosted the first sporting event to ever take place in Parliament in September 2011.

The event brought MPs and peers together as well as gold medallists such as Nicky Hunt on Speakers' Green for a day devoted to the sport.

In February 2013 Irranca-Davies was named Total Politics MP of the Month. He won the award for his work in standing up for farmers and consumers in the Ogmore constituency and across the nation by persuading the government to u-turn on the Groceries Code Adjudicator (GCA) Bill.

References

External links
 Huw Irranca-Davies's Views Channel on YouTube
 

1963 births
Living people
Welsh Labour Party MPs
UK MPs 2001–2005
UK MPs 2005–2010
UK MPs 2010–2015
UK MPs 2015–2017
Wales MSs 2016–2021
Wales MSs 2021–2026
Politicians from Swansea
People educated at Gowerton Comprehensive School
People associated with Swansea Metropolitan University
Politics of Bridgend County Borough
Labour Co-operative members of the Senedd